Salim is a Palestinian town in the northern West Bank, located six kilometers east of Nablus and is a part of the Nablus Governorate. According to the Palestinian Central Bureau of Statistics (PCBS), Salim had a population of approximately 5,100 inhabitants in 2006.

Location
It is bordered by Beit Dajan to the east, Deir al Hatab to the north and west, Beit Dajan and Beit Furik to the south.

History

The village is ancient with foundations of houses.  In 1882, traces of ruins, cisterns, a ruined tank, and a cemetery of rock-cut tombs were noted.

Salim dates back to the Middle Bronze Age. It was near the ancient Canaanite and later Israelite town of Shechem.

The village has been populated in Early Bronze I, Iron Age II, Hellenistic, Roman, Byzantine, Umayyad and Crusader/Ayyubid eras. In a Samaritan text, the town was known to be inhabited by Samaritan High Priests.

Ottoman era
In 1517,  Salim was incorporated into the Ottoman Empire with the rest of  Palestine. In 1596, it  appeared in  Ottoman tax registers as being in the Nahiya of Jabal Qubal of the Liwa of Nablus.  It had a population of 42 households,  all Muslim. The villagers  paid  a fixed tax-rate of 33,3% on agricultural products, including wheat, barley, summer crops, olives, and goats or beehives, and for a press for olives or grapes; a total of 10,432 akçe.

In 1838,  Robinson noted Salim as a village in the same area as the villages Azmut and Deir al-Hatab, all were part of the El-Beitawy district, east of Nablus.

In May, 1870,  Guérin came to the village, after walking through fields of olives, figs and almond trees. He found a village with a maximum of 200 people, in ancient houses. A dozen cisterns in the village were dry, so the women had to fetch water  from a stream, called Ain Salim, about 1 kilometre north-northwest of the village.

In 1882, the PEF's Survey of Western Palestine described Salim  as a small village, but evidently ancient, surrounded by olive-trees and with  two springs to the north.

British Mandate era
In the 1922 census of Palestine conducted by the British Mandate authorities, Salem had a population of 423, all Muslims, while in the 1931 census, Salim, including El Hamra,   had  100 occupied houses and a population of  490, again all Muslim.

In the 1945 statistics Salim had a  population of 660, all Muslims,  with 10,293  dunams of land, according to an official land and population survey. Of this, 229 dunams were plantations and irrigable land, 5,158  used for cereals, while 24 dunams were built-up land.

Jordanian era
During the 1948 war the area was held by units from the Iraqi Army.  In the wake of the 1948 Arab–Israeli War Salim  came  under Jordanian rule.

The Jordanian census of 1961 found 888 inhabitants.

Post-1967
Since the Six-Day War in 1967, Salim has been under Israeli occupation.

After the 1995 accords 27% of the village land is defined to be Area B land, while the remaining 73% is in Area C.

See also
Havat Skali
Ma'ale Iron, including village Salim, northeast of Umm al-Fahm

References

Bibliography

External links
 Welcome To Salim
Survey of Western Palestine, Map 12:    IAA, Wikimedia commons 
 Salim Village Profile,   Applied Research Institute–Jerusalem (ARIJ)
 Salim, aerial photo, ARIJ
 Development priorities and needs in Salim, ARIJ
"A Palestinian woman cries in her home after a raid on Sunday by Israeli troops searching for three abducted Israeli teens, in Salim", Haaretz, Jun. 23, 2014
  Settlers Activities Case Study ... Salim village land 11 October 2001, POICA
 The Village of Salem Between the Israeli Military Occupation and the Israeli Settlements 18 December 2005, POICA
    Elon Moreh Settlers Contaminate Drinking Water in Deir Al Hatab Village 20 September 2007, POICA
 Israeli Halt-of-Construction Orders to 17 Palestinian houses in Salim Village 3 September 2009, POICA
   Under the pretext of building in zone C "Halt of construction orders against 17 Palestinian houses and barracks in Salim village"  7 September 2009, POICA

Villages in the West Bank
Municipalities of the State of Palestine
Ancient Samaritan settlements